The Guayambre River is a river in Honduras. It is one of the two main tributaries of Honduras' longest river, the Patuca.

See also
List of rivers of Honduras

References
Rand McNally, The New International Atlas, 1993.
CIA map: :Image:Honduras rel 1985.jpg
UN map: :Image:Un-honduras.png
Google Maps

Rivers of Honduras